Walter Wahli (born 23 May 1946 in Moutier) is a Swiss biologist and a professor at the University of Lausanne and at Nanyang Technological University of Singapore. His research has contributed to understanding of the control of metabolism by regulation of gene expression. He is known for working on the nuclear receptors, Peroxisome proliferator-activated Receptors, known as PPARs, involved in the energy balance of the body.

Education 
Wahli received his Ph.D. in Biological Sciences from the University of Bern in Switzerland. He then worked as a post-doctoral researcher at the Department of Developmental Biology, Carnegie Institution of Washington in Baltimore, and as a visiting fellow and a visiting associate at the National Institutes of Health (NIH), National Cancer Institute, Bethesda, Maryland, US.

Research and career 
In 1980, Wahli became a full professor and the director of the Institute of Animal Biology at the University of Lausanne where he completed several mandates, such as vice-rector for research, postgraduate and continuing education and founding director of the Center for Integrative Genomics. He then served as a professor of metabolic disease at the Lee Kong Chian School of Medicine, a joint medical school of Nanyang Technological University Singapore and Imperial College London, in Singapore. Since 2019, he is a visiting professor at this school.

Wahli has a longstanding interest in nuclear receptors found within cell nuclei which are responsible for sensing steroid hormones, fatty acids and other lipophilic molecules. Upon activation by these ligands, the receptors regulate the expression of specific genes, thereby controlling key biological processes, such embryonic development, homeostasis, and metabolism of the vertebrates. Since 1977, Wahli reported several discoveries related to the molecular mechanism of action of the estrogen receptor and then of the fatty acid-activated peroxisome proliferator- activated receptors (PPARs), for which he was the co-discoverer, in their functions of regulating lipid and glucose metabolism, inflammation, wound-healing, and cell differentiation processes. He also investigated the role of PPARs in the most common liver disease known as non-alcoholic fatty liver disease (NAFLD). He underscored the potential of PPARs as drug targets for NAFLD that is often associated to metabolic syndrome and Type 2 diabetes. Wahli obtained patents for his inventions. His patents include; "Composition for regulating lipid metabolism", (2013) and "Composition for enhancing immunity", (2019).

Honors 

 Elected member of EMBO (1998) 
 Otto Naegeli Prize (2002)
 European Federation of Lipid Research Award (2002)
 Elected Individual Member of the Swiss National Academy of Medical Sciences (2007)
 Hartmann Müller Prize (2008)
 Lifetime Achievement Award, Faculty of Biology and Medicine, University ofLausanne (2011)
 Chaire d’Excellence Pierre de Fermat, Région Midi-Pyrénées, Toulouse (2013, for 2014–15 tenure).

Publications 

 Peroxisome proliferator-activated receptors: nuclear control of metabolism.
 Differential expression of peroxisome proliferator-activated receptors (PPARs): tissue distribution of PPAR-alpha,-beta, and-gamma in the adult rat.
 Fatty acids and eicosanoids regulate gene expression through direct interactions with peroxisome proliferator-activated receptors α and γ.
 Roles of PPARs in health and disease.
 Peroxisome proliferator–activated receptor α mediates the adaptive response to fasting.

References

External links 
 

1946 births
Living people
Swiss biologists
University of Bern alumni